Indiana Jones and the Last Crusade is the title of four different video games released for various video and computer home systems between 1989 and 1994. The format of each particular video game is different, but they all loosely follow the storyline of the 1989 film.

The Action Game

Indiana Jones and the Last Crusade: The Action Game was released in 1989 for the DOS, Amiga, Amstrad CPC, Atari ST, Commodore 64, Sega Master System, Mega Drive/Genesis, Nintendo Entertainment System, Game Boy, Sega Game Gear, MSX and ZX Spectrum. Each version of the game is similar, with slight differences in the quality of the graphics and sound. This is a side-scrolling adventure game where players control Indiana Jones through various side-scrolling levels from the film, armed with their reflexes and the trademark whip.

The Graphic Adventure

Indiana Jones and the Last Crusade: The Graphic Adventure is a graphic adventure game released by LucasArts for DOS, Amiga, Atari ST and Macintosh systems in 1989. The player controls Dr. Jones as he interacts with various characters and visits areas from the film in order to find the secret of the Holy Grail. The game was re-released twice – first with 256 color graphics and a full digital soundtrack, and later with 256 color graphics, minor bugfixes and the original version's MIDI soundtrack.

Indiana Jones and the Last Crusade (1991)

Produced by Taito for the Nintendo Entertainment System (NES), it is a side-scrolling action adventure game, mixed in with some mini-games involving timed puzzles. The player can also follow some segments of the story and decide which order the character will play each scenario.

References

Last Crusade